Christoph Gawlik (born August 10, 1987) is a German professional ice hockey player. He currently plays for Löwen Frankfurt in the DEL2. Previously he played with Adler Mannheim, Eisbären Berlin, Frankfurt Lions and ERC Ingolstadt.

References

External links

1987 births
Living people
Adler Mannheim players
Düsseldorfer EG players
Eisbären Berlin players
Frankfurt Lions players
German ice hockey left wingers
Löwen Frankfurt players
ERC Ingolstadt players
People from Deggendorf (district)
Sportspeople from Lower Bavaria